John Harris (12 March 1932 – 12 September 2019) was Dean of Brecon from 1993 to 1998.

He was educated at St David's College, Lampeter and ordained in 1958. After curacies in Pontnewynydd and Bassaleg he was held incumbencies in  Penmaen, Newport, Maindee and Llanddew

References

See also

Deans of Brecon Cathedral
20th-century Welsh Anglican priests
1932 births
2019 deaths
Alumni of the University of Wales, Lampeter